Savon or Savón is the surname of:

Amarilis Savón (born 1974), Cuban judoka, Olympic bronze medalist
Erislandy Savón (born 1990), Cuban amateur boxer
Félix Savón (born 1967), Cuban heavyweight boxer, winner of three Olympic gold medals
Vladimir Savon (1940–2005), Ukrainian chess player
SAVON (born October 31, 1997), born Savon Boone. American singer-songwriter. Born in Chicago, Illinois.

See also
Sav-on, Osco drugstore chain
Sav-On gasoline stations, operated by the Oneida nation